Mohammad Amin Beglari (12 August 1918-11 February 1979) was the commander of the Imperial Guard of Mohammed Reza Shah a few months before the collapse of the regime.

He was of Kurdish origin, a deputy commander and loyal to Mohammed Reza Shah. He was assassinated  shortly after General Abdolali Badrei in 1979.

"A third high officer, Gen. Mohammed Amin Beglari, deputy commander of the Imperial Guards, was found dead in his home here today with three bullet wounds in his body."

Some other sources claim that he committed suicide when revolutionary guards stopped his car .

References

Kurdish military personnel

1918 births
1979 deaths